The Beechwood Formation is a geologic formation in Kentucky. It preserves fossils dating back to the Devonian period .

See also

 List of fossiliferous stratigraphic units in Kentucky

References
 

Devonian Indiana
Devonian Kentucky
Devonian southern paleotemperate deposits